Miss Back is a South Korean television reality show created by Nam Seung-hyun and Ahn Dong-soo, developed and produced by Mega Monster and Space Rabbit for MBN. The program revolves around female idols who previously debuted with girl groups, but slowly faded away from the limelight as it aims to give these idols another chance. The show aired on MBN from October 8, 2020 to January 26, 2021.

Participants

Hosts 
 Baek Ji-young
 Song Eun-i
 Yoon Il-sang

Contestants 
 Sera (9MUSES)
 Raina (After School)
 Soyul (Crayon Pop)
 Nada (WA$$UP)
 Gayoung (Stellar)
 Subin (a/k/a DALsooobin) (Dal Shabet)
 Jung Yu-jin (a/k/a Mail) (The Ark)
 Park So-Yeon (T-ara) (featured in episodes 1-3 only)

Discography 
All credits for the show's discography are from Melon.

Part 1

Part 2

Part 3

Part 4

Part 5

Part 6

Part 7

Part 8

Part 9

Part 10

Notes

References 

South Korean reality television series
2020 South Korean television series debuts
2021 South Korean television series endings
Korean-language television shows
South Korean variety television shows
Television series by Mega Monster